Humaira Arshad or Humera Arshad (Punjabi) is a Pakistani pop singer from Lahore born in 1975.

Career
She started her career as an actress in PTV Home's television series Ainak Wala Jin (a PTV show for children in the 1990s) where she played the role of Toofani Nagan.

She is a folk, pop, culture, and ghazal singer who has been classically trained. Her albums are Choori Kach Di and Gal Sun Dholna. Humaira says she used to accompany her mother to majlis for soaz khwani from an early age. She also musically trained under Nusrat Fateh Ali Khan for some time.

Discography

Albums
 Choori Kach Di
"Ankheen Meri"
"Chori Kach Di"
"Dil Se"
"Give Me Chance"
"Hasda Hasanda"
"Jag Soo Gaya"
"Listen To Me"
"O Piya"
"Saanwre"
"Sada Hoon Apne Pyar Ki"
"Sham Ki Ankh"
"Uuf Allah"
 Gal Sun Dholna
"Aa ke Sapnoon Mein"
"Aai Re Raat Mehndi Ki"
"Aaja Paich Laraiye"
"Aashiqui Aashiqui"
"Akhan Tikhiyan"
"Ankhiyan De Vich"
"Dilbar Dil Ke"
"Gul Sun Dholna"
"Habibi Hayya Hayya"
"Main Nai Boldi"
"Mur Aawo Re Sayyan"
"Na Koe Jan Na Pehchan"

Singles
 "Aaja Paich Laraiye"
 "Aashiqui Aashiqui"
 "Akhan Tikhiyan"
 "Dilbar Dil Ke"
 "Gal Sun Dholna"
 "Main Nai Boldi"
 "Mur Aawo Re Sayyan"
 Naats, Hamd and a Ramadan Salaam

Coke Studio
 (2017) "Kaatay Na Katay" alongside Aima Baig & Rachel Viccaji
 (2018) "Luddi Hai Jamalo" With Ali Sethi (Episode 11)

Personal life
Arshad married film actor Ahmed Butt in 2004. They divorced in 2019.

Television shows

Awards and recognition
 'Pakistan Achievement Award' in 2015. She was given this award at a ceremony in London by an organization called 'Pakistan Achievement Awards UK and Europe'.

References

External links
 

Year of birth missing (living people)
Living people
Punjabi people
Pakistani pop singers
Pakistani playback singers
Pakistani women singers
Singers from Lahore
Coke Studio (Pakistani TV program)